Tea Donguzashvili (Georgian: თეა დონღუზაშვილი; born June 4, 1976) is a Russian judoka.

She won a bronze medal in the heavyweight (+78 kg) division at the 2004 Summer Olympics.

External links
 
 
 

1976 births
Living people
Russian female judoka
Judoka at the 2004 Summer Olympics
Judoka at the 2008 Summer Olympics
Olympic judoka of Russia
Olympic bronze medalists for Russia
Olympic medalists in judo
Medalists at the 2004 Summer Olympics
Universiade medalists in judo
Universiade bronze medalists for Russia
Medalists at the 1999 Summer Universiade
20th-century Russian women
21st-century Russian women